Yimenosaurus (meaning "Yiman reptile") is an extinct genus of plateosaurid sauropodomorph dinosaur that lived in China in the Early Jurassic. The genus was first named in 1990 by Ziqi Bai, Jie Yang and Guohui Wang, along with its type and only species, Yimenosaurus youngi. The species name honours renowned Chinese paleontologist Yang Zhongjian, the father of Chinese paleontology, known as C.C. Young in English. Known material includes the holotype, an almost complete skull and mandible, as well as incomplete cervical and dorsal vertebrae, a mostly complete sacrum, an ilium, ischia, partial ribs and complete femur, and a paratype, a well-preserved postcrania with a fragmentary skull.

Discovery and naming
Known from two specimens, Yimenosaurus is relatively complete for its type of sauropodomorph. The specimens were described originally in 1990 by Ziqi Bai, Jie Yang and Guohui Wang, and the describers named for them a complete binomial, Yimenosaurus youngi. Bai et al. created the genus name from Yimen county, the place of discovery in Yunnan Province, and the Latin word saurus, meaning "reptile". For the species, it was chosen to honour Yang Zhongjian, the father and founder of all Chinese paleontology, who was well known for his work on "prosauropods", and called in English C.C. Young. Of the two specimens, the holotype was chosen, known from a more complete skull. The holotype, YXV 8701, is known from a complete skull and mandible only lacking the anterior end of the jaw and minor fragments of bone around the orbit, as well as the postcranial elements of fragmentary cervical and dorsal vertebrae, all sacral vertebrae, an ilium, both ischia, a complete femur, and incomplete and damaged ribs. YXV8702, the paratype, is known from an only incomplete skull, many cervical and dorsal vertebrae, three sacrals, a few caudal vertebrae, a scapula-coracoid, an entire pelvis, and almost both entire hindlimbs. All specimens were recovered from the Fengjiahe Formation.

References

External links
Dinosauria

Early Jurassic dinosaurs of Asia
Plateosauridae
Fossil taxa described in 1990
Paleontology in Yunnan